The Fraternity of the Inner Light is a magical society and Western mystery school founded by Dion Fortune in 1924. It operates from London and accepts pupils.

History
In 1922, after a falling-out with Moina Mathers and with Moina's consent, Dion Fortune left the Alpha et Omega to form an offshoot organization. This indirectly brought new members to the Alpha et Omega. Fortune's group was later renamed "The Fraternity of the Inner Light", and was, later still, renamed "The Society of the Inner Light".

Teachings
Fortune gave her followers preliminary training by means of correspondence courses, on successful completion of which aspirants were initiated into the Lesser Mysteries, then onto Greater Mysteries. These lesser mysteries were roughly equivalent the Outer Order of the Golden Dawn, and the greater mysteries were roughly equivalent to the old Inner Order of the Rosae Rubae et Aureae Crucis ("Ruby Rose and Golden Cross", or the RR et AC).

During its early years, the Fraternity of the Inner Light used many unchanged versions of the Golden Dawn initiation rituals which, as Francis King notes, had a "semi-amicable relationship" with the Stella Matutina. However, alterations were introduced and eventually the ceremonies used bore no resemblance to those of the Golden Dawn, with the exception that they were constructed on the same principles.

The name Fraternity.... referred to the inner plane group, and the word Society.... referred to the physical plane group and those members currently incarnated.   Thus the group considered 'Fraternity' to be the more senior than the 'Society'.

See also
 Divine light
 Margaret Lumley Brown
 Magical organization
 Israel Regardie
 Secret Chiefs

Notes

References
 King, Francis (1989). Modern Ritual Magic: The Rise of Western Occultism.

External links
 

Magical organizations